The canton of Rixheim is an administrative division of the Haut-Rhin department, northeastern France. It was created at the French canton reorganisation which came into effect in March 2015. Its seat is in Rixheim.

It consists of the following communes:

Baldersheim
Bantzenheim
Battenheim
Chalampé
Habsheim
Hombourg
Niffer
Ottmarsheim
Petit-Landau
Riedisheim
Rixheim
Sausheim

References

Cantons of Haut-Rhin